Adkhamjon Ergashev (born 12 March 1999) is an Uzbekistani weightlifter competing in the 62 kg category until 2018, and the 61 kg and 67 kg categories starting in 2018 after the International Weightlifting Federation reorganized the categories.

Career
He competed at the 2014 and 2015 World Weightlifting Championships, and won bronze medals at the 2014 Summer Youth Olympics and 2018 Asian games. Ergashev also won the 62 kg division at the 2016 IWF Youth World Championship.

At the 2018 World Weightlifting Championships he set 3 junior world records in the 61 kg class. At the 5th International Qatar Cup he competed in the 67 kg division, setting junior world records in the snatch and total.

He competed in the men's 67 kg event at the 2020 Summer Olympics in Tokyo, Japan.

Major results

References

External links
 

1999 births
Living people
Uzbekistani male weightlifters
Weightlifters at the 2014 Summer Youth Olympics
Asian Games medalists in weightlifting
Asian Games bronze medalists for Uzbekistan
Weightlifters at the 2018 Asian Games
Medalists at the 2018 Asian Games
Weightlifters at the 2020 Summer Olympics
Olympic weightlifters of Uzbekistan
Islamic Solidarity Games competitors for Uzbekistan
Islamic Solidarity Games medalists in weightlifting
21st-century Uzbekistani people